Chenab College may refer to:

 Chenab College Jhang, in Jhang, Punjab, Pakistan (head branch) 
 Chenab College Chiniot, in Chiniot district, Punjab, Pakistan
 Chenab College Shorkot, a college in Chehab College group
 Chenab College Athara Hazari, a college in Chehab College group
 Chenab College Ahmed Pur Sial, a college in Chehab College group